This is a list of seasons played by Lechia Gdańsk in Polish and European football, from 1945 (the year of the club's foundation) to the most recent completed season.

The club has won the Polish Cup twice, the Polish SuperCup twice, and has a highest ever league finish of third in the Ekstraklasa. This list details the club's achievements in all major competitions, and those players who were the leagues top scorers.

References

 
Lechia Gdańsk
Polish football club seasons